Mauritius sent a delegation to compete at the 2008 Summer Paralympics in Beijing, People's Republic of China. Two athletes represented the country in athletics and swimming.

Athletics

Men

Swimming

Men

See also
Mauritius at the Paralympics
Mauritius at the 2008 Summer Olympics

References

External links
International Paralympic Committee

Nations at the 2008 Summer Paralympics
2008
Paralympics